Kalashnik is a Ukrainian occupational surname, meaning "maker of kalaches". A man who made kalaches was called a калачник (kalachnik), which sometimes by sandhi effect became калашник (kalashnik), and such a man's descendants thus got the surname Калачник (Kalachnik) or Калашник (Kalashnik). In Russian language the Ukrainian variant morphed into Калашников (Kalashnikov) (with the suffix -ов meaning "belonging to", "son of"). Its English-spelling derivations could include Kalashnik, Kalachnik, Kalashnyk, Kalachnyk, Kalačnik, Kalašnik, Kalasnik or Kolashnik, Kolachnik, Kolashnyk, Kolachnyk, Kolačnik, Kolašnik, Kolasnik. There are close to 12,000 people in Ukraine with the last name of Kalashnik, geographically concentrated mostly in Central and Eastern parts of Ukraine.

It may refer to the following individuals: 

 Aleksei Kalashnik — a Russian professional football player of Ukrainian descent.
 Anna Kalashnyk (born 1992) — Ukrainian artistic gymnast
 Pavlo Kalashnik — traditional Ukrainian artisan, potter.
 Stanislav Kalashnik — Ukrainian architect, artist, known for creating a general plan for the development of the city of Ternopil between 1982 and 2002.
 Volodymyr Kalashnik — Ukrainian linguist, professor and academic.
 Yakiv Kalashnik — Ukrainian painter.

References

Ukrainian-language surnames
Occupational surnames
Surnames of Ukrainian origin